Adventism in Sichuan refers to the history and implantation of Adventism in the Chinese province of Sichuan (formerly romanized as Szechwan; also referred to as "West China").

History 

Early in 1914, the Seventh-day Adventist Church (SDA) officials in China laid plans to establish a mission station in Sichuan, Francis Arthur Allum and Merritt C. Warren were chosen to be the mission's pioneers, accompanied by three Chinese staff members —Dju Dzi Ih, Shi Yung Gwei and Li Fah Kung— from Honan Province. The five men arrived in Chungking and rented some quarters to construct a small chapel and bungalows for the mission staff. Meanwhile the Chinese staff members traveled around the city and its surrounding areas, securing hundreds of subscriptions to their monthly magazine Signs of the Times. Four persons were baptized on July 3, 1915. A second group of converts formed in a market town to the south of Chungking. The SDA's Szechwan Mission was officially formed in 1917. In 1919, the mission was divided into East Szechwan Mission and West Szechwan Mission for easier administration. Merritt C. Warren became director of the East Szechwan Mission. Initially, the extreme west region was designated the Tibetan Mission headquartered at Tachienlu.

East Szechwan Mission 
The East Szechwan Mission was centered in the city of Chungking, where the SDA established its first mission station. From 1919 to 1921, church activities in Chungking were restricted due to civil unrest. The East Szechwan Mission experienced very slow growth, between 1922 and 1925 the membership grew by only 20 individuals. In 1927, a German medical missionary Johann Heinrich Effenberg took a trip into the regions north of Chungking, where he established 4 Sabbath schools, opened 2 chapels, and baptized 24 individuals. In 1928 he reported that the mission had 7 outstations, 5 organized churches, 5 elementary schools with an enrolment of 70, and 11 Sabbath Schools with a total average attendance of 300 individuals. During the two-year period of 1927 to 1929, two Chinese workers were killed by brigands, another was imprisoned, a married couple were badly beaten, and a chapel was looted by communist forces. At this time, a total baptized membership of 222 was reported by Effenberg. Dallas R. White succeeded Effenberg, he reported the number of baptized Adventists had risen to 534 by June 1933. During the Second World War the number dropped to 271, but rose to 656 in 1948, and reached the peak of 711 in 1951.

West Szechwan Mission 
The West Szechwan Mission had its headquarters in the capital city of Chengtu. In 1917, Merritt C. Warren and Claude L. Blandford took an exploratory trip to Chengtu. After identifying some suitable rental premises for pioneer missionaries, Claude and Ida Blandford immediately began their work at Chengtu. A little church of 13 baptized members was gathered by mid-1919. In 1920, the mission established an out-station and an elementary school with 62 pupils, while church membership rose to 22 despite civil unrest in the region. Ida taught in the elementary school and nurtured Sabbath Schools. She contracted pneumonia and meningitis and died on May 5, 1922. In 1923, Sidney Henton Lindt became the mission's caretaker leader while Blandford returned to America on a furlough. In 1926, Alton Eugene Hughes assumed leadership of West Szechwan Mission. In 1927, Alton and Emma Hughes were driven out of Chengtu by a recurrent civil unrest, they were unable to return until about May 1928. Despite the troubles, the number of converts rose to 115. The mission gathered a second church and established seven out-stations. During the 1930s, the number of organized churches rose to four, and baptized membership increased to 236 in 1939. After the Second World War, several public evangelistic crusades injected fresh life into the congregations, but such flourishing period was brief, because communist forces gradually overran the country and made it difficult for Christian missions to function properly. In 1946, Holman Carl Currie assumed the position of director of the West Szechwan Mission, but late in 1948, missionaries were ordered to evacuate Sichuan due to communist threat. Currie left for Taiwan, his assistant Djan Tieh Nung continued with the mission work throughout 1948 and baptized about 50 new converts.

Tibetan Mission 

The SDA administration regarded the mission in Chungking as a stepping stone to entering Tibet, thus an exploratory trip further west to Chengtu was carried out in February 1917, in order to establish another stage in their Tibetan quest to eventually reaching Lhasa. The next year, a medical missionary John Nevins Andrews (grandson of Elder J. N. Andrews) and his wife Dorothy Spicer traveled to Tachienlu, an East Tibetan city located in West Sichuan. They started out in a drafty wooden house where the wind blew constantly. In 1921, several houses were built by the mission for general medical services. According to Dr. Andrews's report, an average of about 50 people went to him for medical treatment on a daily basis. The mission also printed exhortations and evangelistic leaflets in Tibetan language. The mission was not very fruitful in terms of conversion, because of the strong Buddhist presence in the region. In 1926, the missionaries welcomed their first three converts. By 1929, a church was organized with six baptized members.

Current situation 

After the communist takeover of China in 1949, Protestant Churches in China were forced to sever their ties with respective overseas Churches, which has thus led to the merging of all the denominations into communist-sanctioned Three-Self Patriotic Church.

The 1952 Seventh-day Adventist Yearbook acknowledged that political circumstances made it impossible to accurately report any more mission activities in China.

On May 22, 2010, Rebekah Liu was ordained pastor for the church in her home province of Sichuan, which was started by her mother back in 1988. According to a 2012 report by Spectrum, there were over 10,000 Christians adhering to the Adventist tradition in Sichuan, with five ordained pastors, four of whom are women. Rebekah attended the first Women in Pastoral Ministry Conference in Papua New Guinea in September 2013, on which occasion she shared her life story as she struggled to go from a communist and evolutionist background to how she became a full-time Seventh-day Adventist pastor in Chengtu.

Directors

East Szechwan Mission 
 1919–1923: Merritt C. Warren
 1923–1924: Ernest L. Lutz
 1924–1926: Alton Eugene Hughes
 1926–1932: Johann Heinrich Effenberg
 1932–1935: Dallas R. White
 1936: George L. Wilkinson
 1937–1939: Cecil Bennett Guild
 1939–1940: Djang Djen-chiang
 1941: Cecil Bennett Guild
 1942–1948: Liu Fu-an
 1948–1950: Goh Chiao Oh
 1951: Chiu Chi Hsiu

West Szechwan Mission 
 1919–1926: Claude Lockyer Blandford
 1926–1932: Alton Eugene Hughes
 1932–1933: Charles A. Woolsey
 1933–1939: Alexander Blackburn Buzzell
 1940–1942: Cecil Bennett Guild
 1943–1946: Giang Tsung Kwang
 1946–1948: Holman Carl Currie
 1949–1951: Djan Tieh Nung

See also 

 Christianity in Sichuan
 Catholic Church in Sichuan
 Protestantism in Sichuan
 Anglicanism in Sichuan
 Methodism in Sichuan
 Quakerism in Sichuan
 Baptist Christianity in Sichuan
 Anti-Christian Movement (China)
 Anti-missionary riots in China
 Denunciation Movement
 House church (China)
 General Conference of Seventh-day Adventists
 History of the Seventh-day Adventist Church
 Signs of the Times Publishing Association (Taiwan)

References 

History of the Seventh-day Adventist Church
History of Christianity in Sichuan
Protestantism in Sichuan
Protestantism in Tibet